Arup is a Dano-Norwegian surname and an Indian given name. Notable people with the name include:

Erik Arup (Erik Ipsen Arup), Danish historian
Jens Lauritz Arup, Norwegian bishop and politician
Katie Arup, British fencer
Ove Arup (Sir Ove Nyquist Arup), Anglo-Danish engineer and founder of Arup Group
Arup Bose, Indian Professor of Theoretical Statistics and Mathematics.
Arup Chattopadhyay, Indian tabla player
Arup Ratan Choudhury, Bangladeshi dental specialist and media personality
Arup Debnath, Indian footballer
Jens Arup Seip (Jens Lauritz Arup Seip), Norwegian historian
Arup Raha (Air Marshal Arup Raha), Indian Air Force officer
Arup Roy, Indian politician and Minister for Agricultural Marketing in the Government of West Bengal
Didrik Arup Seip, professor of North Germanic languages at the University of Oslo